Bouzais is a commune in the Cher department in the Centre-Val de Loire region of France.

Geography
The A71 autoroute runs straight through the middle of the commune’s territory.

Population

Places of interest
 The church of St.Roch, dating from the fourteenth century.

See also
Communes of the Cher department

References

Communes of Cher (department)